In ten-dimensional geometry, a rectified 10-orthoplex is a convex uniform 10-polytope, being a rectification of the regular 10-orthoplex.

There are 10 rectifications of the 10-orthoplex. Vertices of the rectified 10-orthoplex are located at the edge-centers of the 9-orthoplex. Vertices of the birectified 10-orthoplex are located in the triangular face centers of the 10-orthoplex. Vertices of the trirectified 10-orthoplex are located in the tetrahedral cell centers of the 10-orthoplex.

These polytopes are part of a family 1023 uniform 10-polytopes with BC10 symmetry.

Rectified 10-orthoplex 

In ten-dimensional geometry, a rectified 10-orthoplex is a 10-polytope, being a rectification of the regular 10-orthoplex.

Rectified 10-orthoplex 

The rectified 10-orthoplex is the vertex figure for the demidekeractic honeycomb.
  or

Alternate names 
 rectified decacross (Acronym rake) (Jonathan Bowers)

Construction 

There are two Coxeter groups associated with the rectified 10-orthoplex, one with the C10 or [4,38] Coxeter group, and a lower symmetry with two copies of 9-orthoplex facets, alternating, with the D10 or [37,1,1] Coxeter group.

Cartesian coordinates 
Cartesian coordinates for the vertices of a rectified 10-orthoplex, centered at the origin, edge length  are all permutations of:
 (±1,±1,0,0,0,0,0,0,0,0)

Root vectors 
Its 180 vertices represent the root vectors of the simple Lie group D10. The vertices can be seen in 3 hyperplanes, with the 45 vertices rectified 9-simplices facets on opposite sides, and 90 vertices of an expanded 9-simplex passing through the center. When combined with the 20 vertices of the 9-orthoplex, these vertices represent the 200 root vectors of the simple Lie group B10.

Images

Birectified 10-orthoplex

Alternate names 
 Birectified decacross

Cartesian coordinates 
Cartesian coordinates for the vertices of a birectified 10-orthoplex, centered at the origin, edge length  are all permutations of:
 (±1,±1,±1,0,0,0,0,0,0,0)

Images

Trirectified 10-orthoplex

Alternate names 
 Trirectified decacross (Acronym trake) (Jonathan Bowers)

Cartesian coordinates 
Cartesian coordinates for the vertices of a trirectified 10-orthoplex, centered at the origin, edge length  are all permutations of:
 (±1,±1,±1,±1,0,0,0,0,0,0)

Images

Quadrirectified 10-orthoplex

Alternate names 
 Quadrirectified decacross (Acronym brake) (Jonthan Bowers)

Cartesian coordinates 
Cartesian coordinates for the vertices of a quadrirectified 10-orthoplex, centered at the origin, edge length  are all permutations of:
 (±1,±1,±1,±1,±1,0,0,0,0,0)

Images

Notes

References 
 H.S.M. Coxeter:
 H.S.M. Coxeter, Regular Polytopes, 3rd Edition, Dover New York, 1973
 Kaleidoscopes: Selected Writings of H.S.M. Coxeter, edited by F. Arthur Sherk, Peter McMullen, Anthony C. Thompson, Asia Ivic Weiss, Wiley-Interscience Publication, 1995,  
 (Paper 22) H.S.M. Coxeter, Regular and Semi Regular Polytopes I, [Math. Zeit. 46 (1940) 380-407, MR 2,10]
 (Paper 23) H.S.M. Coxeter, Regular and Semi-Regular Polytopes II, [Math. Zeit. 188 (1985) 559-591]
 (Paper 24) H.S.M. Coxeter, Regular and Semi-Regular Polytopes III, [Math. Zeit. 200 (1988) 3-45]
 Norman Johnson Uniform Polytopes, Manuscript (1991)
 N.W. Johnson: The Theory of Uniform Polytopes and Honeycombs, Ph.D. (1966)
  x3o3o3o3o3o3o3o3o4o - ka, o3x3o3o3o3o3o3o3o4o - rake, o3o3x3o3o3o3o3o3o4o - brake, o3o3o3x3o3o3o3o3o4o - trake, o3o3o3o3x3o3o3o3o4o - terake, o3o3o3o3o3x3o3o3o4o - terade, o3o3o3o3o3o3x3o3o4o - trade, o3o3o3o3o3o3o3x3o4o - brade, o3o3o3o3o3o3o3o3x4o - rade, o3o3o3o3o3o3o3o3o4x - deker

External links 
 Polytopes of Various Dimensions
 Multi-dimensional Glossary

10-polytopes